Shuter may refer to the following people:
Edward Shuter (c. 1728–1776), English actor 
Frank Shuter (1943–1997), New Zealand speedway rider
John Shuter (1855–1920), English cricketer
John Shuter Smith (c.1813–1871), Canadian lawyer and political figure
 Leonard Shuter (cricketer, born 1852) (1852–1928), English cricketer
 Leonard Shuter (cricketer, born 1887) (1887–1960), his son, English cricketer
Rob Shuter (born 1973), English gossip columnist, magazine editor, talk-show host, and author
Robert M. Shuter (born 1946), American author, academic and consultant